Gillisonville is an unincorporated community and census-designated place (CDP) in Jasper County, in the U.S. state of South Carolina. It was first listed as a CDP in the 2020 census with a population of 183.

History
A post office called Gillisonville was in operation from 1840 until 1927. During the Civil War, Gillisonville was nearly obliterated by order of Maj. Gen. William Tecumseh Sherman.

Gillisonville Baptist Church is listed on the National Register of Historic Places.

Gillisonville has hosted PGA Tour since 2021 as replacement tournaments.  During the 2020-21 season, the Palmetto Championship, a one-off tournament to replace the RBC Canadian Open, was held in June 2021.  During the 2022-23 PGA Tour season, the CJ Cup, normally held in Korea, is slated to be held in Gillisonville.

Transportation
The main roads through Gillisonville are U.S. Route 278 (Gray's Highway) and South Carolina Highway 462. SC 462 runs along Gillison Branch Road. then turns south along an overlap with US 278 before branching off again onto Morgandollar Road.

Demographics

2020 census

Note: the US Census treats Hispanic/Latino as an ethnic category. This table excludes Latinos from the racial categories and assigns them to a separate category. Hispanics/Latinos can be of any race.

References

Unincorporated communities in Jasper County, South Carolina
Unincorporated communities in South Carolina
Census-designated places in Jasper County, South Carolina
Census-designated places in South Carolina